Colette Nys-Mazure (born 14 May 1939) is a Belgian poet, essayist, playwright, and novelist writing in French.

She was born in Wavre. She received a master's degree in modern literature from the Catholic University of Leuven. From 1961 to 1999, she taught French literature.

Following the death of her parents, she moved to Tournai.

She also writes books for young people and essays. Her work has been translated into English, German, Polish, Italian, Japanese, Dutch, Czech, Swedish and other languages.

Selected works 
 La vie à foison, poetry (1975)
 D'amour et de cendre, poetry (1977)
 Pénétrance, poetry (1981), received the 
 Haute enfance, poetry (1990), received the Grand Prix de Poésie pour la Jeunesse awarded by the French Ministry of National Education, Youth and Sports
 Singulières et plurielles, poetry (1992)
 Tous locataires, play (1993) with 
 La Criée d'aube, poetry (1995)
 Le For intérieur, poetry (1996), received the Prix  de Poésie
 Contes d’espérance, short stories (1998)
 Dix minutes pour écrire, play (2002)
 Seuils de Loire, poetry (2003)
 Sans y toucher, short stories (2004), received the 
 Perdre pied, novel (2008)

References 

1939 births
Living people
Belgian women poets
Belgian women short story writers
Belgian short story writers
Belgian women novelists
20th-century Belgian dramatists and playwrights
Women dramatists and playwrights
Belgian writers in French